The 1906 municipal election was held December 10, 1906 for the purpose of electing a mayor and five aldermen to sit on the Edmonton City Council, as well as five public school trustees and six separate school trustees.  There were eight aldermen on city council, but three of the positions were already filled: Robert Manson, Joseph Henri Picard, and Samuel Smith had been elected to two-year terms in 1905, and were still in office.  William Antrobus Griesbach had also been elected to a two-year term, but resigned to run for mayor.  Accordingly, the fifth place aldermanic candidate in the 1906 election - Morton MacAuley - was elected only to serve out the remaining year of Griesbach's term.

Voter turnout

There were 1221 ballots cast in the 1906 municipal election.  The number of eligible voters is no longer available.

Results

(bold indicates elected, italics indicate incumbent)

Mayor

William Antrobus Griesbach - 717
Thomas Bellamy - 301
H J Dawson - 144

Aldermen

Wilfrid Gariépy - 585
Thomas Daly - 564
James Walker - 559
Cameron Anderson - 480
Morton MacAuley - 417
Gustave Koerman - 399
Wade Stuart - 312
Lucien Dubuc - 305
A H Allen - 276
W S Weeks - 260
J R Hetherington - 91
F M Lannic - 77

Public school trustees

W D Ferris, H A Gray,  A E May, Alex Taylor, and Hedley C. Taylor were elected.  Detailed results are no longer available.

Separate (Catholic) school trustees

Wilfrid Gariépy, E J Hart, Prosper-Edmond Lessard, Joseph Henri Picard,  S Schultz, and O Tessier were elected.  Detailed results are no longer available.

References
City of Edmonton: Edmonton Elections

1906
1906 elections in Canada
1906 in Alberta